Anoushka Ashit Parikh (born 26 March 1997) is an Indian badminton player.

Achievements

South Asian Games 
Women's doubles

BWF International Challenge/Series 
Women's doubles

Mixed doubles

  BWF International Challenge tournament
  BWF International Series tournament
  BWF Future Series tournament

References

External links
 

Living people
1997 births
Sportspeople from Ahmedabad
Racket sportspeople from Gujarat
Sportswomen from Gujarat
Indian female badminton players
South Asian Games gold medalists for India
South Asian Games bronze medalists for India
South Asian Games medalists in badminton
20th-century Indian women
21st-century Indian women